Aleksandra Dunin-Wąsowicz (10 June 1932 – 22 July 2015) was a Polish archaeologist at the Institute of Archaeology and Ethnology of the Polish Academy of Sciences. She has published studies, primarily in French, of the development of technology in Ancient Greece, and edited  archeological maps of the area.

Published works
1965 - Wasowicz, Aleksandra. Tokarstwo i bednarstwo w starozytnej Grecji (Tournage et tonnellerie en Grèce antique), Kwartalnik Historii Kultury Materialnej 13, pp. 455–467.
1966 - Wasowicz, Aleksandra. Remarques sur la chronologie des principales techniques du traitement du bois dans la Grčce antique, Kwartalnik Historii Kultury Materialnej 16, pp. 739–743.
1967 - Wasowicz, Aleksandra. Plan miasta i plan zaplecza rolniczego kolonii greckiej (Znaczenie nowych zródel archeologicznych); (Plan de la ville et du territoire agricole d'une colonie grecque. Importance des nouvelles sources archéologiques), Kwartalnik Historii Kultury Materialnej 15, pp. 743–755.
1975 Wasowicz, Aleksandra. Olbia Pontique et son territoire : l'aménagement de l'espace Paris: Belles-lettres, 1975. .
Musée du Louvre, Paule Pinelli, and Aleksandra Wąsowicz. Catalogue des bois et stucs grecs et romains provenant de Kertch. Paris: Ministère de la culture et de la communications, Editions de la Réunion des musées nationaux, 1986.  
1979 - Wasowicz, Aleksandra. Les serviteurs sur les monuments funéraires du Pont-Euxin. Éléments pour une enquête.
1999 - Ackinazi I., Scholl T., Wasowicz Aleksandra, and Zinko V. N. Archaeological Map of Nymphaion (Crimea), Polish Academy of Sciences, 1999.

References

1932 births
2015 deaths
20th-century Polish archaeologists
Polish women archaeologists